The first season of the Brazilian version of the music competition show  X Factor premiered on Monday, August 29, 2016 at  (BRT/AMT) on Band, with reruns airing the following day at  (BRT/AMT) on TNT.

Based on the UK format, the competition consists of auditions, in front of producers and then the judges with a live audience; boot camp; four-chair challenge and then the live finals.

The original judging panel consisted of Rick Bonadio, Alinne Rosa, Di Ferrero and Paulo Miklos, with Fernanda Paes Leme as main host and Mauricio Meirelles as social media correspondent.

An early preview of X Factor aired following Band's broadcast of the season finale of the third season of MasterChef on August 24, 2016.

Selection process

Auditions
Open auditions in front of the show's producers took place at the Arena Corinthians, São Paulo from July 9 to July 10, 2016.

Band network reported that over 30,000 people auditioned for the show.

Judges' auditions
Judges' auditions took place at the Dom Bosco Theatre on Colégio Salesiano Santa Teresinha, São Paulo from July 25 to July 29, 2016.

Bootcamp

Four-chair challenge
Key
 – Contestant was immediately eliminated after performance without switch
 – Contestant was switched out later in the competition and eventually eliminated
 – Contestant was not switched out and made the final four of their own category

Contestants
The top 16 contestants were confirmed as follows:
Key
 – Winner
 – Runner-up
 – Third place

Live shows

Results summary

Key
 – Contestant did not perform
 – Contestant was chosen as the bottom four by their mentor and had to sing again in the final showdown
 – Contestant was in the bottom three and had to sing again in the final showdown
 – Contestant was in the bottom three but received the fewest votes and was immediately eliminated
 – Contestant received the fewest public votes and was immediately eliminated (no final showdown)
 – Contestant received the most public votes

Live show details

Week 1
October 24
 Theme: Judges' choice
Group performance: "Can't Stop the Feeling!"

 Each mentor selected one finalist from their own category to advance. The bottom four acts performed another song of their choice in a final showdown and the public was required to save one of them based on the performance.

October 26
 Theme: Judges' choice

 Each mentor selected one finalist from their own category to advance. The bottom four acts performed another song of their choice in a final showdown and the public was required to save one of them based on the performance.

Week 2
October 31
 Theme: Halloween
 Group performance: "Sympathy for the Devil"
 Musical guest: Paula Fernandes ("Pra Você" / "Olhos do Céu") and NX Zero ("Modo Avião")

 Judges' votes to eliminate
 Miklos: Diego Martins – backed his own act, Valter Jr. & Vinicius
 Ferrero: Valter Jr. & Vinicius – backed his own act, Diego Martins
 Rosa: Valter Jr. & Vinicius – based on the final showdown performances
 Bonadio: Diego Martins – said that Valter Jr. & Vinicius had more potential

With the acts in the bottom two receiving two votes each, the result was deadlocked and reverted to the earlier public vote. Valter Jr. & Vinicius were eliminated as the act with the fewest public votes.

Week 3
November 7
 Theme: Retro
 Group performance: "Whisky a Go Go"
 Musical guests: 
 Monday: Il Volo ("'O sole mio" (shown on TV) / "Nessun dorma" (online only)) – (pre-recorded on October 31)
 Wednesday: Anitta ("Sim ou Não" / "Bang" / "Essa Mina É Louca") and Alinne Rosa ("País da Fantasia")

 Judges' votes to eliminate
 Rosa: Naomi Dominguez – gave no reason
 Miklos: Naomi Dominguez – based on the final showdown performances
 Bonadio: Heloá Holanda – based on the final showdown performances 
 Ferrero: Naomi Dominguez – gave no reason

Week 4
November 14
 Theme: Movies & Greatest hits
 Group performance: "Lady Marmalade" / "Diamonds Are a Girl's Best Friend" / "Your Song"
 Musical guest: Karol Conka ("Tombei" / "Maracutaia" / "É o Poder") and Paulo Miklos ("Sangue Latino")

 Judges' votes to eliminate
 Bonadio: Jenni Mosello – based on the final showdown performances 
 Ferrero: Heloá Holanda – based on the final showdown performances 
 Miklos: Jenni Mosello – gave no reason
 Rosa: Heloá Holanda – would not eliminate either of her acts so chose to put it to public vote by equalising the votes

With the acts in the final showdown receiving two votes each, the result was deadlocked and reverted to the earlier public vote. Heloá Holanda was eliminated as the act with the fewest public votes.

Week 5: Final
November 21
 Theme: Judges' choice & Contestant's choice

 Judges' votes to eliminate
 Miklos: Conrado Bragança – backed his own act, Ravena
 Ferrero: Ravena – backed his own act, Conrado Bragança
 Bonadio: Conrado Bragança – gave no reason
 Rosa: Conrado Bragança – gave no reason

November 23
 Theme: Contestant's choice & Winner's song (billed as "song to win")
 Group performance: "Viva la Vida" (Top 10 finalists)
 Musical guests: Ludmilla ("Sou Eu" / "Bom"), Tiago Iorc ("Amei Te Ver"), Jota Quest ("Blecaute" / "Um Dia Pra Não Se Esquecer")

Following the announcement that Clark had won, he performed "Kiss".

Ratings and reception

Brazilian ratings
All numbers are in points and provided by IBOPE.

 In 2016, each point represents 69.417 households in São Paulo.

References

External links
X Factor on Band.com.br
 

2016 Brazilian television seasons
2016 Brazilian television series debuts
Brazil 01